The tippler is a breed of domestic pigeon bred to participate in endurance competitions. Flying results of up to 22 hours (non-stop) have been reported.

Origins 

The pigeon evolved from the rock pigeon (Columba livia) that is endemic to the region between the Mediterranean and China. Some pigeon breeds are believed to have originated from the Middle East, although the origin of the tippler is uncertain. The predominant theory is that the tippler was a cross breed, between the homing pigeon (Indian Highflyers/Tumblers) and the cumulet. This cross-breeding was thought to improve the bird's endurance and allow a larger flight range. It is proposed that selection for this long-term flying ability helped to eliminate its progenitor's tumbling flight behavior. The breed is believed to have originated in 1845, near the silk milling towns of Congleton and Macclesfield in East Cheshire, England. The breeder's aim was to perfect the "butterfly action" of the wings. The ease and grace of the wings enabled the tippler to attain its long flight duration. Levi, in The Pigeon, cites a reference from Hepworth (1893) who interviewed W. Jolly of Mill Green, who claimed that he had been breeding tipplers for fifty-six years. That would take the origin back to at least 1837. Levi also commented that the breed was developed around the towns of Rainow and Macclesfield. It further mentions, "Macclesfield tipplers", as a strain or type of tippler and that they were named after the region in which they were developed.

Types 

Tippler "types"  were named after their breeders or their original location. Most of these types can stay aloft for over 19 hours.

"Hughes" were bred by Gordon Hughes in Derby, with a flying record of 18:07 in 1976.

"Sam Billingham", Arthur Newton, Joe Davies, and Jack Holland were also among England's top breeders.

Other popular types include "Lovatt", "Merredith", Shannon (also known as Irish Delight) and Sheffield (usually colored red and yellow).

Training 

Tipplers are intelligent birds and can be trained to fly long hours and drop only when asked.

Competitions and flying rules 

The homing pigeon flies to race home, the Roller pigeon flies to roll, but the tippler just flies. Tippler fanciers can compete anywhere in the world without traveling. A "kit" of tipplers consists of three or more birds. Each tippler club has defined flying rules. Generally, the aim is for the whole kit to fly as long as possible. When one lands, or if the fancier gives the landing sign, the competition ends. Usually, the birds must be seen every hour by the referee to make sure that they are indeed flying. Most clubs base their flying rules on the "NTU flying rules".

The two categories of competition are young birds and old birds. A young bird is one hatched during the current year that bears a seamless band issued for that year. Any other bird is regarded as an old bird, regardless of its actual age. The first old bird race is usually about the middle of April, with others at two week intervals. The most important competition occupies the so-called Long Day. The longest (weekend) day of the year.

In Pakistan many fanciers and associations organize endurance competitions. In the Rawalpindi-Islamabad area, the All Pakistan Pigeons Lovers Association organizes two competitions one in September or October and one in May. Each fancier comes with a team of seven to eleven birds. In May, the competition starts at 4:50 am when the temperature gets up to 45 degrees. The total time scored by each team is calculated at the end and prizes are awarded. These competitions are not only a source of amusement but also an opportunity for social interaction.

International records 

 International Results 2007

|-
| 14:43 || Hrithik Halder ||  Khulna, Bangladesh , Bangladesh || 2020
|}
|-

Clubs

See also 
 Homing pigeon
 List of pigeon breeds

References

External links 
 36 stages for the Flying Tippler Novice, W. Matthews, N.T.U. Yearbook 1987. Retrieved December 27, 2005.
 N.T.U. Yearbook 1990/1991. Retrieved November 5, 2006.
 Tippler Pigeons: Breed Information & Facts - Pigeonpedia
 "Flight Performance, Energetics and Water Turnover of Tippler Pigeons with a Harness and Dorsal Load", JA Gessaman, GW Workman, MR Fuller, 1991.
 The secrets of Tippler Pigeon Flying with 18 Invaluable Receipts by J Stanway
 Origins of the English Flying Tipplers by Jack Prescott, February 2006.
 
 CURLEY, J. T. 1961. The time-flying tippler pigeon sport. Howell Book House, New York, NY. 
 International Tipplers
 Articles by Jack Prescott
 Tipplers.com
 BBC: Tippler Pigeon fans' fury over falcon threat

Pigeon breeds
Pigeon sport